Ilya Viktorovich Naishuller (born November 19, 1983) is a film director and a musician. He is known for directing action films Hardcore Henry (2015) and Nobody (2021). He is the founder of film production company Versus Pictures and the indie rock band Biting Elbows.

Life 
Naishuller was born in Moscow, the son of a surgeon mother and a businessman father of Jewish background. From the ages of seven to fourteen he lived in London and attended private school.

He studied at the New York University Tisch School of the Arts and met several filmmakers he would collaborate with later. Naishuller left school to pursue music. In 2008, he founded the rock band Biting Elbows as lead singer and guitarist. In 2011, he released the EP Dope Fiend Massacre and the debut album Biting Elbows.

In 2013, Naishuller directed and starred in Bad Motherfucker – the music video for a Biting Elbows' hit single. Shot entirely in POV, Bad Mother Fucker became a viral online hit with over 150 million cumulative views The video caught the attention of Hollywood agents, actors and directors and was praised by Darren Aronofsky.

In 2015 Naishuller directed an independent feature Hardcore, later renamed Hardcore Henry. It starred Sharlto Copley and Tim Roth and was produced by Timur Bekmambetov, Inga Vainshtein Smith and Ekaterina Kononenko. Naishuller is also credited as screenwriter, director, producer and acted in the film as well. The film premiered at the Toronto International Film Festival in 2015 and won the festival's People's Choice Award. It was released theatrically by STXfilms on April 8, 2016. It went on to gross $14.3 million USD, in the US. Simultaneously Naishuller and writers, Brain Philipson and Will Stewart, released the comic book titled 'Hardcore Akan #1', the origin story for Hardcore Henry.

The music video "Kolshchik" that Naishuller directed for the Russian rock band Leningrad won the Berlin Music Video Awards in 2017, while taking the first place for the "Best Concept" category.

In 2021, Naishuller directed Nobody, an American action film written by Derek Kolstad. The Universal Pictures film stars Bob Odenkirk, Connie Nielsen, Aleksey Serebryakov, RZA and Christopher Lloyd. The film premiered as theaters in the United States were starting to reopen, following the initial COVID-19 outbreak. Nobody debuted at #1 at the US Box Office in its opening weekend.

Filmography

Music videos

Film

Other works

References

External links 
 Official Website for Biting Elbows
 

Russian screenwriters
Russian film directors
Russian people of Jewish descent
1983 births
Living people
Russian rock musicians
Mass media people from Moscow
Action film directors
Russian activists against the 2022 Russian invasion of Ukraine